SS August Belmont was a Liberty ship built in the United States during World War II. She was named after August Belmont, a German-American politician, financier, foreign diplomat, and party chairman of the Democratic National Committee during the 1860s. Belmont was an U.S. Ambassador to the Netherlands and U.S. Consul-General to the Austrian Empire and later a horse-breeder and racehorse owner. He was the founder and namesake of the Belmont Stakes.

Construction
August Belmont was laid down on 1 March 1944, under a Maritime Commission (MARCOM) contract, MC hull 2474, by the St. Johns River Shipbuilding Company, Jacksonville, Florida; she was sponsored by Mrs. W.H. Slappey, the sister of Max and Kenneth Merrill, the president and vice president of St. John's River SB, and was launched on 20 April 1944.

History
She was allocated to the South Atlantic Steamship Lines, on 30 April 1944. On 30 May 1948, she was laid up in the National Defense Reserve Fleet, Wilmington, North Carolina. On 20 February 1958, she was laid up in the James River Reserve Fleet, Lee Hall, Virginia.  She was sold for scrapping, 24 July 1970, to I.C.E. Chemicals, Inc., for $113,099. She was removed from the fleet on 19 August 1970.

References

Bibliography

 
 
 
 

 

Liberty ships
Ships built in Jacksonville, Florida
1944 ships
Wilmington Reserve Fleet
James River Reserve Fleet